General elections were held in British Honduras in December 1969. Citizens elected 18 members to the British Honduras Legislative Assembly for a term of five years.

The ruling People's United Party (PUP) won 17 of the 18 seats in the elections, increasing its large majority. Among the opposition only Philip Goldson, leader of the National Independence Party, retained his seat.

Results

References

British H
General elections in Belize
1969 in British Honduras
British H
British H